The World Bowls Tour (WBT) is a limited company formed in September 1996 by the Professional Bowls Association, and the two major governing bodies for world flat green bowls, World Bowls and the World Indoor Bowls Council (WIBC).

The primary object of WBT is to set up a series of premier bowls events at which the top players in the world can play.

Players
The top 16 players automatically entered into the four main tournaments. The rest of the players are made up of qualifiers.

The top 16 for the 2007–08 season are: 
	 David Gourlay
	 Greg Harlow
	 Paul Foster
	 Alex Marshall
	 Jason Greenslade
	 Robert Weale
	 Andy Thomson
	 Mervyn King
	 Kelvin Kerkow
	 Jonathan Ross
	 Ian Bond
	 Mark McMahon
	 Mark Royal
	 Billy Jackson
	 Les Gillett
	 John Price

Calendar 
Co-operative Funeralcare World Matchplay 2007, Ponds Forge, Sheffield, 21–22 June 2007
Engage International Open 2007, Ponds Forge, Sheffield, 28 October to 4 November 2007
The Great British Mobility Group Scottish International Open 2007, Dewars, Perth, 24 November to 1 December 2007
Potters Holidays World Indoor Bowls Championships 2007, Potters Leisure Resort, Norfolk, 7–27 January 2008
Welsh International Open 2007, Selwyn Samuel Centre, Llanelli, Wales, 2–8 February 2008

Events
The 2007–08 season saw the arrival of a new tournament, the 'Co-operative Funeralcare World Matchplay 2007'.

As well as this new event, the four main tournaments open to all the top 16 players will be played in their traditional months.

Co-operative Funeralcare World Matchplay 2007
Greg Harlow extended his unbeaten run at Ponds Forge, Sheffield to a magnificent 18 games when he beat Mervyn King in the Co-operative Funeralcare World Match Play Championship.

Every game of the tournament was broadcast live on Sky Sports – the first time that the broadcaster had given the World Bowls Tour such lengthily coverage.

Harlow, 38, has won the three previous International Open's at Ponds Forge – a record that no one has managed to do.

“It's unbelievable, I don't know what it is - I just wish we could play all our WBT events here,” said an ecstatic Harlow after being asked by Sky Sports presenter Lee McKenzie to explain the secret of his success at the Sheffield venue.

Results
Semi-finals
[8] Mervyn King (ENG) bt [4] Alex Marshall (SCO)	11–6, 9-7 
[2] Greg Harlow (ENG) bt [6] Robert Weale (WAL)	6–5, 5-5 
Final: 
[2] Greg Harlow (ENG) bt [8] Mervyn King (ENG)	10–8, 4–10, 2-0

Engage International Open 2007
Scotland's Paul Foster captured his first ever International Open title in Sheffield after winning a match tie-breaker with Jason Greenslade.
The three-time World Singles Champion from Troon notched up a maximum count of four shots on the first end before going on to take the first set 15–5. 
Welshman Greenslade hit back, edging a closely fought second set 6–5. 
But in the three-end tie-break, Foster won 2–1 to claim one of the few WBT ranking titles to elude him so far.
"Obviously this was an important triumph for me as it plugged a significant gap in my CV and to win two successive WBT ranking events is no mean achievement," he said.

Results 
Semi-finals:
[5] Jason Greenslade (WAL) bt [4] Alex Marshall (SCO) 7-7, 8-6
[3] Paul Foster (SCO) bt [2] David Gourlay (AUS) 4–8, 11–3, 2-1

Final: 
[3] Paul Foster (SCO) bt [5] Jason Greenslade (WAL)  15–5, 5–6, 2-1

The Great British Mobility Group Scottish International Open 2007
Andy Thomson won the Great British Mobility Scottish International Open at Perth, beating Mark Royal 11-5 8–5 in the final at the Dewar's Centre. 
The St Andrews-born number eight seed, representing England, was always in control against Royal, seeded 13. 
Royal had earlier shocked top seed Kevin Kerkow as well as ending Paul Foster's hopes of holding three World Bowls Tour titles simultaneously. 
Thomson was responsible for defeating second seed David Gourlay.

Results
Semi-finals:
(13) M Royal (Eng) bt Holder (1) K Kerkow (Aus) 7-10 9-8 2-1
(8) A Thomson (Eng) bt (6) J Greenslade (Wal) 10-9 2-10 2-1

Final: 
(8) Andy Thomson (Eng) bt (13) Mark Royal (Eng) 11-5 8–5,

Potters Holidays World Indoor Bowls Championships 2008

See also
2006-07 World Bowls Tour

2007 in bowls
2008 in bowls